Jenna Suokko (born 14 June 1995) is a Finnish ice hockey player, currently playing with the Buffalo Beauts of the Premier Hockey Federation (PHF).

Playing career 
At age 15, Suokko made her debut in the Naisten SM-sarja (renamed Naisten Liiga in 2017), the premier women’s ice hockey league in Finland, with the Tampereen Ilves Naiset in the 2010–11 season. She remained with the team the following season, winning Aurora Borealis Cup silver medals in 2011 and again in 2012. Ilves won the IIHF European Women's Champions Cup (EWCC) in 2011 – the only Finnish team to ever win the tournament – and Suokko recorded a goal against SKIF Nizhny Novgorod in the round-robin finals. Suokko's teammates from the 2011 EWCC Chazmpion roster included Anna Kilponen, Sari Kärnä, Rosa Lindstedt, Saara Niemi, Heidi Pelttari, and Mari Saarinen.   

In 2012, Suokko joined Team Oriflame Kuortane, where she reunited with former Ilves teammate Anna Kilponen and joined a roster of rising stars in Finnish women's ice hockey, including Suvi Ollikainen, Tiina Ranne, Vilma Tanskanen, Saana Valkama, and Ella Viitasuo. Team Kuortane won the U20 SM-turnaus ('Under-20 Finnish Championship tournament') in 2013 and 2014 but they struggled in the SM-sarja and were forced to save themselves from being relegated to the Naisten Mestis in the 2013–14 season.  

Suokko returned to Ilves for the 2014–15 season and won Finnish Championship bronze. In the 2015–16 season, she played two games with Team Kuortane before enrolling at Olds College in Olds, Alberta, Canada and joining the Olds College Broncos women's ice hockey program of the Alberta Colleges Athletics Conference (ACAC). She led the team in scoring, with 8 goals and 4 assists for 12 points in 22 games, and was honoured as the 2015–16 ACAC Women's Hockey Rookie of the Year. 

The following season, Suokko signed with Leksands IF Dam of the Swedish Women's Hockey League (SDHL). She tallied 5 goals and a team-leading 37 penalty minutes (PIM) in the 36 game 2016–17 SDHL season. 

After playing two seasons abroad, she returned to Finland in 2017 to begin university studies and to play with Ilves Tampere. The move quickly paid off and Ilves won Aurora Borealis Cup silver medals in 2017–18 and 2018–19. Suokko developed from seventh ranked for team scoring in the 2017–18 season to third in 2018–19 (behind only Linda Leppänen and Riikka Noronen) to the team’s top scorer in the 2019–20 and 2020–21 seasons. She served as an alternate captain, along with Kreetta Kulhua, Jenna Lehtiniemi and Helen Puputti, in the leadership group of captain Anna Kilponen during the 2020–21 season and was named to the 2021 Naisten Liiga All-Star Team II.

At the conclusion of the 2020–21 season, Suokko had played 249 regular season games in the Naisten Liiga and amassed 116 goals and 107 assists for 223 points, a career average of 0.90 points per game.

On 4 August 2021, Suokko signed a one year contract with the Buffalo Beauts of the PHF. She is the second Finn to play in the league and the first since the collapse of the Canadian Women's Hockey League (CWHL) and founding of the Professional Women's Hockey Players Association (PWHPA); the first Finn to play in the PHF (then called the NWHL) was goaltender Meeri Räisänen, who played with the Connecticut Whale in the 2018–19 season.

International play 
Suokko was a member of the Finnish national under-18 team during 2010 to 2013 and represented Finland at the IIHF Women's World U18 Championships (WW18) in 2011, 2012, and 2013. At the 2011 tournament, Finland beat Switzerland in the bronze medal match to earn its first U18 Worlds medal.

At the senior level, Suokko has played with the Finnish national under-22 team (also called the Finland National Development Team) and the Finnish national team, first in August 2014. She represented Finland at the Nations Cup in 2016 and won silver after the team successfully pushed Canada to overtime in the gold medal match. As of August 2021, Suokko has played 17 international matches with the Finnish national team but has not been selected to represent Finland at the IIHF Women's World Championship or Olympic Games.

Personal life 
Suokko has a bachelor's degree in nursing from Tampere University of Applied Sciences and has worked as a hemodialysis nurse.

Career statistics

Regular season and playoffs 

* Postseason results for the 2013–14 season are from the qualification series rather than the playoffs and are not calculated with playoff totals.

References

External links
 

Living people
1995 births
Finnish women's ice hockey forwards
Ice hockey people from Tampere
Buffalo Beauts players
Ilves Naiset players
Leksands IF Dam players
Team Kuortane players
Finnish expatriate ice hockey players in Canada
Finnish expatriate ice hockey players in Sweden
Finnish expatriate ice hockey players in the United States